The ninth generation of video game consoles began in November 2020 with the releases of Microsoft's Xbox Series X and Series S console family and Sony's PlayStation 5.

Compared to the 8th-gen Xbox One and PlayStation 4, the new consoles add faster computation and graphics processors, support for real-time ray tracing graphics, output for 4K resolution, and in some cases, 8K resolution, with rendering speeds targeting 60 frames per second (fps) or higher. Internally, both console families introduced new internal solid-state drive (SSD) systems to be used as high-throughput memory and storage systems for games to reduce or eliminate loading times and support in-game streaming. The Xbox Series S and the PlayStation 5 Digital Edition lack an optical drive while retaining support for online distribution and storing games on external USB devices.

The positioning of these consoles as high-performance computing devices places competitors such as the Nintendo Switch and cloud gaming services such as Amazon Luna as overlaps from the prior eighth generation of video game consoles.

Background
The duration from the eighth generation until the start of the ninth was one of the longest in history, having started in 2012 with the release of Nintendo's Wii U. Past generations typically had five-year windows as a result of Moore's law, but Microsoft and Sony instead launched mid-console redesigns, the Xbox One X and PlayStation 4 Pro. Microsoft also launched a monthly console lease program, with the option to buy or upgrade. Some analysts believed these factors signaled the first major shift away from the idea of console generations because the potential technical gains of new hardware had become nominal.

Microsoft and Sony had announced their new consoles in 2019 for release by the end of 2020, prior to the COVID-19 pandemic. When the pandemic struck in March 2020, it impacted both marketing and production of the consoles. The cancelled E3 2020 had been planned as a major venue to premiere the consoles, and instead both Microsoft and Sony turned to online showcases to highlight the systems and launch games. Both companies acknowledged that the pandemic had strained their production supplies due to hardware manufacturing slowdowns starting in March 2020, but would not impact their console release windows, and they set consumer expectations that console supplies would likely be limited in the launch window and would slowly become more relaxed as the pandemic waned. This created a wave of scalping through online stores, which was countered by manufacturers and vendors. The ongoing global chip shortage continued to affect console shipments through the end of 2021, with Sony warning of lower production numbers during the final calendar quarter of the year and into 2022; this also affected Nintendo's Switch console production rates and Valve's plans to release the portable Steam Deck handheld gaming computer in 2021.

Main consoles

PlayStation 5

The PlayStation 5 was developed by Sony as the successor to the PlayStation 4 and was first released on November 12, 2020. The primary goal of the PlayStation 5's development was to reduce loading times in games, particularly those that use in-game streaming such as when the player moves across an open world. Sony developed a custom solid-state drive (SSD) architecture based on a 12-channel, 825 GB SSD along with a fast software decompression method that enables an input/output speed of up to 8 to 9 GB/s. In most early development tests, this virtually eliminated loading screens and masking loading times for open world games. The main system is backed by an AMD Zen 2 system on a chip running at a variable frequency capped at 3.5 GHz, and a RDNA 2 GPU also running at a variable frequency capped at 2.23 GHz. The GPU has a total potential processing power of 10.28 teraflops. The system comes with 16 GB of memory.

The PlayStation 5 was launched with two models. The base model includes an optical disc reader for most disc formats including Blu-ray, UHD Blu-ray, and retail PlayStation 5 games. A cheaper Digital model lacks the disc reader, but otherwise is equivalent to the base model. Both models support expanded memory options to store games and other data onto external drives, thus allowing players to obtain and store games through online distribution via the PlayStation Store. The PlayStation 5 has mostly complete backward compatibility with PlayStation 4 games, with only a limited number of games not currently supported on the console, while the PlayStation Now cloud service is available for users to play games from the older PlayStation consoles.

Xbox Series X/S 

The Xbox Series X/S is the successor to the Xbox One and was released on November 10, 2020 in select regions. Microsoft followed the Xbox One's dual console models: a high-end line (the Series X comparable to the Xbox One X), and a cheaper model (the Series S comparable to the Xbox One S). The performance goal for the Xbox Series X was about four times that of the Xbox One X, but without sacrificing game development for the lower-end Xbox Series S.

Both the Xbox Series X and Series S use an AMD Zen 2 CPU and an RDNA 2 GPU but with different frequencies and compute units. The Series S has lower frequencies with reduced performance, and the Series X has graphics performance estimated at 12.14 teraflops compared to the Series S's 4.006 teraflops. Microsoft developed a Velocity Architecture, which includes an internal SSD system (1 TB on the Series X, 500 GB on the Series S) used for storing games and new DirectX interfaces with improved input/output and in-game texture streaming and rendering. The Series X includes an optical disc reader supporting Blu-ray and UHD media, which is absent in the Series S. Both consoles support external game storage media and online distribution via Xbox Live. Full backward compatibility was announced for all Xbox One games, including previously supported Xbox and Xbox 360 games but excluding Kinect games. Microsoft encouraged third-party developers and publishers to use its Smart Delivery approach to give Xbox One games free performance upgrade patches for Xbox Series X/S.

Comparison

Other consoles

Nintendo Switch

The Nintendo Switch's position compared to the PlayStation 5 or Xbox Series X/S remains unclear. The console was released in March 2017, long before either of these units, as Nintendo wanted to recover quickly from the commercial failure of the Wii U. As they had done with the original Wii, Nintendo designed the Switch in a blue ocean strategy to set the console apart from the competition. The Switch has generally been technologically considered a member of the eighth generation, due to lower processing power. It remains competitive, however, hosting multiplatform games alongside PlayStation 5 and Xbox Series X/S. These Switch versions may be supplemented by the power of cloud gaming based solutions, as with Control and Hitman 3.

Steam Deck

On February 25, 2022, Valve released the Steam Deck, a handheld computer that runs SteamOS 3.0, a Linux distribution developed by Valve. The Deck includes Valve's own Proton compatibility layer, allowing nearly all Windows-based games to run on the Deck without modification. The handheld also allows users to install Windows or other software on the device. The Steam Deck was the first handheld to use an RDNA 2 GPU, which is also used on both the home consoles of the ninth generation. The handheld was well-received by many outlets, with an overall praising of its extensive game compatibility and portability.

Cloud gaming platforms
Two major cloud gaming platforms, Stadia and Amazon Luna, were introduced in November 2019 and October 2020, respectively. Along with existing cloud systems like GeForce Now, these systems lack any financial breakthrough as home video game consoles, but they are viable for multiplatform ninth generation games. One handheld console made to capitalize on this trend is the Logitech G CLOUD Gaming Handheld. However, in the case of Stadia, Google had difficulty finding a market for its services direct to gamers and officially shut down Stadia on January 19, 2023, though using the old tech as a white label project for third-party users.

While Sony promoted its PlayStation lineup of narrative-driven game exclusives, Microsoft promoted its cloud gaming Xbox Game Pass, a departure from console war strategy. This gave Microsoft a head start in what analysts expected to be a major complementary service, supplementing the unprofitable console business and appealing to more entry-level players with better accessibility at a lower price. Sony revamped its PlayStation Plus subscription in mid-2022 by merging in PlayStation Now, its cloud-based service for games of past PlayStation generations, as a feature in a higher subscription tier.

See also 

List of video game consoles
List of home video game consoles
List of handheld game consoles
List of dedicated video game consoles

Notes

References 

 
History of video game consoles 09
09
.Consoles09
Video game consoles09
2020s video games